Chiliomodi is a village in eastern Corinthia, Peloponnese, Greece. It was the seat of the municipality of Tenea.  Chiliomodi is situated in a valley, 3 km southeast of Koutalas, 5 km west of Athikia, 21 km southwest of Corinth and 43 km northeast of Argos. It is on the Greek National Road 7 (Corinth – Argos – Tripoli – Kalamata) and on the railway from Corinth to Kalamata. Chiliomodi has several schools, shops and a church. Chiliomodi suffered damage from the 2007 Greek forest fires.

Climate

Chiliomodi has a hot-summer Mediterranean climate (Köppen climate classification: Csa). Chiliomodi experiences hot, dry summers and cool, wet winters.

Notable people

Panagiotis Verdes, inventor of 6x6x6, 7x7x7, 8x8x8, 9x9x9 Twisty Puzzles
Irene Papas (1929–2022), actress and singer
Manousos Manousakis (born 1950), writer, director
1000mods, stoner rock band

Historical population

Archaeological findings 
Near the village of Chiliomodi in 2018, archaeologists led by Elena Korka discovered “proof  of  the existence of the ancient city” of Tenea which is assumed to be founded by prisoners of the mythic Trojan War. Stone, clay and marble floors, about 200 rare coins, seven burials with vases and jewelry dating to the Roman era and Hellenistic period were revealed during the excavation. According to Elena Korka, Tenea’s cutting coins was the indicator of its complete independence.

See also
List of settlements in Corinthia

References

External links
Chiliomodi Public School (in Greek)

Populated places in Corinthia